A bracket, as used in British English, is either of two tall fore- or back-facing punctuation marks commonly used to isolate a segment of text or data from its surroundings. Typically deployed in symmetric pairs, an individual bracket may be identified as a 'left' or 'right' bracket or, alternatively, an "opening bracket" or "closing bracket", respectively, depending on the directionality of the context.

There are four primary types of brackets. In British usage they are known as round brackets (or simply "brackets"), square brackets, curly brackets, and angle brackets; in American usage they are respectively known as parentheses, brackets, braces, and chevrons. There are also various less common symbols considered brackets.

Various forms of brackets are used in mathematics, with specific mathematical meanings, often for denoting specific mathematical functions and subformulas.

History
Angle brackets or chevrons ⟨ ⟩ were the earliest type of bracket to appear in written English. Desiderius Erasmus Roterodamus coined the term  to refer to the round brackets or parentheses recalling the shape of the crescent moon.

Most typewriters only had the left and right parenthesis. Square brackets appeared with some teleprinters.

Braces (curly brackets) first became part of a character set with the 8-bit code of the IBM 7030 Stretch.

In 1961, ASCII contained parenthesis, square, and curly brackets, and also less-than and greater-than signs that could be used as angle brackets.

Typography
In English, typographers mostly prefer not to set brackets in italics, even when the enclosed text is italic. However, in other languages like German, if brackets enclose text in italics, they are usually also set in italics.

Round brackets or parentheses 

 

Round brackets (British) or parentheses  (American; singular parenthesis ), ( and ), are commonly called simply "brackets" in the UK, India, Ireland, Canada, the West Indies, New Zealand, South Africa and Australia; they are also known as "parens" , "circle brackets", or "smooth brackets".

Uses of 

Parentheses contain adjunctive material that serves to clarify (in the manner of a gloss) or is aside from the main point. A milder effect may be obtained by using a pair of commas as the delimiter, though if the sentence contains commas for other purposes, visual confusion may result. That issue is fixed by using a pair of dashes instead, to bracket the parenthetical.

In American usage, parentheses are usually considered separate from other brackets, and calling them "brackets" is unusual.

Parentheses may be used in formal writing to add supplementary information, such as "Senator John McCain (R - Arizona) spoke at length". They can also indicate shorthand for "either singular or plural" for nouns, e.g. "the claim(s)". It can also be used for gender neutral language, especially in languages with grammatical gender, e.g. "(s)he agreed with his/her physician" (the slash in the second instance, as one alternative is replacing the other, not adding to it).

Parenthetical phrases have been used extensively in informal writing and stream of consciousness literature. Examples include the southern American author William Faulkner (see Absalom, Absalom! and the Quentin section of The Sound and the Fury) as well as poet E. E. Cummings.

Parentheses have historically been used where the dash is currently used in alternatives, such as "parenthesis)(parentheses". Examples of this usage can be seen in editions of Fowler's.

Parentheses may be nested (generally with one set (such as this) inside another set). This is not commonly used in formal writing (though sometimes other brackets [especially square brackets] will be used for one or more inner set of parentheses [in other words, secondary {or even tertiary} phrases can be found within the main parenthetical sentence]).

Any punctuation inside parentheses or other brackets is independent of the rest of the text: "Mrs Pennyfarthing (What? Yes, that was her name!) was my landlady." In this use, the explanatory text in the parentheses is a parenthesis. Parenthesized text is usually short and within a single sentence. Where several sentences of supplemental material are used in parentheses the final full stop would be within the parentheses, or simply omitted. Again, the parenthesis implies that the meaning and flow of the text is supplemental to the rest of the text and the whole would be unchanged were the parenthesized sentences removed.

In more formal usage, "parenthesis" may refer to the entire bracketed text, not just to the punctuation marks used (so all the text in this set of round brackets may be said to be "a parenthesis", "a parenthetical", or "a parenthetical phrase").

In linguistics, parentheses are used for indistinguishable or unidentified utterances.

Enumerations
An unpaired right parenthesis is often used as part of a label in an ordered list:

Accounting
Traditionally in accounting, contra amounts are placed in parentheses. A debit balance account in a series of credit balances will have parenthesis and vice versa.

Parentheses in mathematics

Parentheses are used in mathematical notation to indicate grouping, often inducing a different order of operations. For example: in the usual order of algebraic operations,  equals 14, since the multiplication is done before the addition. However,  equals 20, because the parentheses override normal precedence, causing the addition to be done first. Some authors follow the convention in mathematical equations that, when parentheses have one level of nesting, the inner pair are parentheses and the outer pair are square brackets. Example:

A related convention is that when parentheses have two levels of nesting, curly brackets (braces) are the outermost pair. Following this convention, when more than three levels of nesting are needed, often a cycle of parentheses, square brackets, and curly brackets will continue. This helps to distinguish between one such level and the next.

Various notations, like the vinculum, have a similar effect in specifying order of operations, or otherwise grouping several characters together for a common purpose.

Parentheses are also be used for many other purposes in mathematics. Two common uses are for function arguments and tuples.  They are used to set apart the arguments in mathematical functions. For example,  is the function  applied to the variable . In coordinate systems parentheses are used to denote a tuple of coordinates; so in the Cartesian coordinate system  may represent the point located at 4 on the x-axis and 7 on the y-axis.

Parentheses in programming languages
Parentheses are included in the syntaxes of many programming languages. Typically needed to denote an argument; to tell the compiler what data type the Method/Function needs to look for first in order to initialise. In some cases, such as in LISP, parentheses are a fundamental construct of the language. They are also often used for scoping functions and operators and for arrays. In syntax diagrams they are used for grouping, such as in extended Backus–Naur form.

In Mathematica and the Wolfram language, parentheses are used to indicate grouping for example, with pure anonymous functions.

Taxonomy
If it is desired to include the subgenus when giving the scientific name of an animal species or subspecies, the subgenus's name is provided in parentheses between the genus name and the specific epithet. For instance, Polyphylla (Xerasiobia) alba is a way to cite the species Polyphylla alba while also mentioning that it's in the subgenus Xerasiobia. There is also a convention of citing a subgenus by enclosing it in parentheses after its genus, e.g., Polyphylla (Xerasiobia) is a way to refer to the subgenus Xerasiobia within the genus Polyphylla. Parentheses are similarly used to cite a subgenus with the name of a prokaryotic species, although the International Code of Nomenclature of Prokaryotes (ICNP) requires the use of the abbreviation "subgen." as well, e.g., Acetobacter (subgen. Gluconoacetobacter) liquefaciens.

In some contexts, it is typical to cite the author's name alongside the taxon. In these contexts, parentheses mean that the author placed that species in a different genus from the one in that combination. The International Code of Zoological Nomenclature gives the example of Hymenolepis diminuta  to indicate that Karl Rudolphi did not consider this species to be in the genus Hymenolepis when he first described the species. The author citation in zoology also allows the possibility of citing whoever transferred the species to the new genus, as in, Methiolopsis geniculata . Parentheses are similarly used for new combinations of prokaryotes as well; the ICNP provides the example: Microbacterium oxydans  to indicate that Chatelain and Second first described the species in a different genus, namely Brevibacterium, but in 1999 Schumann et al. transferred it to its present genus. Author citations in botany also use parentheses in this way where the author (or abbreviation thereof) of the basionym is in parentheses followed by the author (or abbreviation thereof) of whoever created that particular combination; the International Code of Nomenclature for algae, fungi, and plants provides the example Helianthemum aegyptiacum  to indicate that Carl Linnaeus first described this species in a different genus, in this case Cistus, but then Philip Miller transferred it to the genus Helianthemum.

Chemistry and physics
Parentheses are used in chemistry to denote a repeated substructure within a molecule, e.g. HC(CH3)3 (isobutane) or, similarly, to indicate the stoichiometry of ionic compounds with such substructures: e.g. Ca(NO3)2 (calcium nitrate).

They can be used in various fields as notation to indicate the amount of uncertainty in a numerical quantity. For example:

 1234.56789(11)
is equivalent to:
 

e.g. the value of the Boltzmann constant could be quoted as  J⋅K−1 .

Pop songs 
Words are sometimes bracketed in pop song titles.  The reasons are diverse, including marking off words that can be removed to save space, differentiating remixes or alternate versions, identifying important themes, making the title easier for fans to recall, or distinguishing them from songs with similar titles.  In other cases, music critics have identified them as a stylistic quirk or joke.

Square brackets or brackets 

Square brackets (British) or brackets (American), [ and ], are also called "crotchets", "closed brackets", or "hard brackets".

Tournament brackets, the diagrammatic representation of the series of games played during a sports tournament usually leading to a single winner, are so named for their resemblance to brackets or braces.

Uses of [ ]

Square brackets are often used to insert explanatory material or to mark where a [word or] passage was omitted from an original material by someone other than the original author, or to mark modifications in quotations. In transcribed interviews, sounds,  responses and reactions that are not words but that can be described are set off in square brackets — "... [laughs] ...".

When quoted material is in any way altered, the alterations are enclosed in square brackets within the quotation to show that the quotation is not exactly as given, or to add an annotation. For example: The Plaintiff asserted his cause is just, stating,

In the original quoted sentence, the word "my" was capitalized: it has been modified in the quotation given and the change signalled with brackets. Similarly, where the quotation contained a grammatical error (is/are), the quoting author signalled that the error was in the original with "[sic]" (Latin for 'thus').

A bracketed ellipsis, [...], is often used to indicate omitted material: "I'd like to thank [several unimportant people] for their tolerance [...]"
Bracketed comments inserted into a quote indicate where the original has been modified for clarity: "I appreciate it [the honor], but I must refuse", and "the future of psionics [see definition] is in doubt". Or one can quote the original statement "I hate to do laundry" with a (sometimes grammatical) modification inserted: He "hate[s] to do laundry".

Additionally, a small letter can be replaced by a capital one, when the beginning of the original printed text is being quoted in another piece of text or when the original text has been omitted for succinctness— for example, when referring to a verbose original: "To the extent that policymakers and elite opinion in general have made use of economic analysis at all, they have, as the saying goes, done so the way a drunkard uses a lamppost: for support, not illumination", can be quoted succinctly as: "[P]olicymakers [...] have made use of economic analysis [...] the way a drunkard uses a lamppost: for support, not illumination." When nested parentheses are needed, brackets are sometimes used as a substitute for the inner pair of parentheses within the outer pair. When deeper levels of nesting are needed, convention is to alternate between parentheses and brackets at each level.

Alternatively, empty square brackets can also indicate omitted material, usually single letter only. The original, "Reading is also a process and it also changes you." can be rewritten in a quote as: It has been suggested that reading can "also change[] you".

In translated works, brackets are used to signify the same word or phrase in the original language to avoid ambiguity.
For example: He is trained in the way of the open hand [karate].

Style and usage guides originating in the news industry of the twentieth century, such as the AP Stylebook, recommend against the use of square brackets because "They cannot be transmitted over news wires." However, this guidance has little relevance outside of the technological constraints of the industry and era.

In linguistics, phonetic transcriptions are generally enclosed within square brackets, often using the International Phonetic Alphabet#Brackets and transcription delimiters, whereas phonemic transcriptions typically use paired slashes. Pipes (| |) are often used to indicate a morphophonemic rather than phonemic representation. Other conventions are double slashes (// //), double pipes (|| ||) and curly brackets ({ }).

In lexicography, square brackets usually surround the section of a dictionary entry which contains the etymology of the word the entry defines.

Proofreading
Brackets (called move-left symbols or move right symbols) are added to the sides of text in proofreading to indicate changes in indentation:

Square brackets are used to denote parts of the text that need to be checked when preparing drafts prior to finalizing a document.

Law
Square brackets are used in some countries in the citation of law reports to identify parallel citations to non-official reporters. For example:

In some other countries (such as England and Wales), square brackets are used to indicate that the year is part of the citation and parentheses are used to indicate the year the judgment was given. For example:

This case is in the 1954 volume of the Appeal Cases reports, although the decision may have been given in 1953 or earlier. Compare with:

This citation reports a decision from 1954, in volume 98 of the Solicitors Journal which may be published in 1955 or later.

They often denote points that have not yet been agreed to in legal drafts and the year in which a report was made for certain case law decisions.

Square brackets in mathematics

Brackets are used in mathematics in a variety of notations, including standard notations for commutators, the floor function, the Lie bracket, equivalence classes, the Iverson bracket, and matrices.

Square brackets may be used exclusively or in combination with parentheses to represent intervals.  For example, represents the set of real numbers from 0 to 5 inclusive. Both parentheses and brackets are used to denote a half-open interval;  would be the set of all real numbers between 5 and 12, including 5 but not 12. The numbers may come as close as they like to 12, including 11.999 and so forth, but 12.0 is not included. In some European countries, the notation  is also used. The endpoint adjoining the square bracket is known as closed, whereas the endpoint adjoining the parenthesis is known as open.

In group theory and ring theory, brackets denote the commutator.

Chemistry

Square brackets can also be used in chemistry to represent the concentration of a chemical substance in solution and to denote charge a Lewis structure of an ion (particularly distributed charge in a complex ion), repeating chemical units (particularly in polymers) and transition state structures, among other uses.

Square brackets in programming languages
Brackets are used in many computer programming languages, primarily for array indexing. But they are also used to denote general tuples, sets and other structures, just as in mathematics. There may be several other uses as well, depending on the language at hand. In syntax diagrams they are used for optional portions, such as in extended Backus–Naur form.

Curly brackets or braces 

Curly brackets (British) or braces (American), { and }, are also known as "curly braces",  "definite brackets", "swirly brackets", "birdie brackets", "French brackets", "Scottish brackets", "squirrelly brackets", "gullwings", "seagulls", "squiggly brackets", "twirly brackets", "Tuborg brackets" (DK), "accolades" (NL), "pointy brackets", "fancy brackets", "M Braces", "moustache brackets", "squiggly parentheses", or "flower brackets" (India).

Uses of { }

Curly brackets are rarely used in prose and have no widely accepted use in formal writing, but may be used to mark words or sentences that should be taken as a group, to avoid confusion when other types of brackets are already in use, or for a special purpose specific to the publication (such as in a dictionary). More commonly, they are used to indicate a group of lines that should be taken together, such as in when referring to several lines of poetry that should be repeated.

As an extension to the International Phonetic Alphabet (IPA), braces are used for prosodic notation.

Music
In music, they are known as "accolades" or "braces", and connect two or more lines (staves) of music that are played simultaneously.

Curly brackets in programming languages

In many programming languages, curly brackets enclose groups of statements and create a local scope. Such languages (C, C#, C++ and many others) are therefore called curly bracket languages. They are also used to define structures and enumerated type in these languages.

In syntax diagrams they are used for repetition, such as in extended Backus–Naur form.

In the Z formal specification language, braces define a set.

Curly brackets in mathematics

In mathematics they delimit sets and are often also used to denote the Poisson bracket between two quantities.

Angle brackets or chevrons 

Angle brackets (British) or chevrons (American), ⟨ and ⟩, are also known as "pointy brackets", "triangular brackets", "diamond brackets", "tuples", "guillemets", "left and right carets", "broken brackets", or "brokets".

The ASCII less-than and greater-than characters  are often used for angle brackets. In most cases only those characters are accepted by computer programs, the Unicode angle brackets are not recognized (for instance in HTML tags). The characters for "single" guillemets  are also often used, and sometimes normal guillemets  when nested angle brackets are needed.

Shape 
Angle brackets are larger than less-than and greater-than signs, which in turn are larger than guillemets.

Uses of ⟨ ⟩

Angle brackets are infrequently used to denote words that are thought instead of spoken, such as:

In textual criticism, and hence in many editions of pre-modern works, chevrons denote sections of the text which are illegible or otherwise lost; the editor will often insert their own reconstruction where possible within them.

In comic books, chevrons are often used to mark dialogue that has been translated notionally from another language; in other words, if a character is speaking another language, instead of writing in the other language and providing a translation, one writes the translated text within chevrons. Since no foreign language is actually written, this is only notionally translated.

In linguistics, angle brackets identify graphemes (letters of an alphabet) or orthography, as in "The English word  is spelled ."

In epigraphy, they may be used for mechanical transliterations of a text into the Latin script.

In East Asian punctuation, angle brackets are used as quotation marks. Chevron-like symbols are part of standard Chinese, Japanese and Korean punctuation, where they generally enclose the titles of books: ︿ and ﹀ or ︽ and ︾ for traditional vertical printing, and 〈 and 〉 or 《 and 》 for horizontal printing.

Angle brackets in mathematics

Angle brackets (or 'chevrons') are used in group theory to write group presentations, and to denote the subgroup generated by a collection of elements. In set theory, chevrons or parentheses are used to denote ordered pairs and other tuples, whereas curly brackets are used for unordered sets.

Physics and mechanics

In physical sciences and statistical mechanics, angle brackets are used to denote an average (expected value) over time or over another continuous parameter. For example:

This is known as Dirac notation or bra–ket notation, to note vectors from the dual spaces of the Bra . But there are other notations used.

In continuum mechanics, chevrons may be used as Macaulay brackets.

Angle brackets in programming languages
In C++ chevrons (actually less-than and greater-than) are used to surround arguments to templates.

In the Z formal specification language chevrons define a sequence.

In HTML, chevrons (actually 'greater than' and 'less than' symbols) are used to bracket meta text. For example  denotes that the following text should be displayed as bold. Pairs of meta text tags are required – much as brackets themselves are usually in pairs. This use is sometimes extended as an informal mechanism for communicating mood or tone in digital formats such as messaging, for example adding "<sighs>" at the end of a sentence.

Other brackets

Lenticular brackets【】

They are used in titles and headings in both Chinese and Japanese. In Japanese, they are most frequently seen in dictionaries for quoting Chinese characters and Sino-Japanese loanwords.

Floor ⌊ ⌋ and ceiling ⌈ ⌉ corner brackets

Quine corners ⌜⌝ and half brackets ⸤ ⸥ or ⸢ ⸣
The Quine corners  and  have at least two uses in mathematical logic: either as quasi-quotation, a generalization of quotation marks, or to denote the Gödel number of the enclosed expression.

Half brackets are used in English to mark added text, such as in translations: "Bill saw ⸤her⸥".

In editions of papyrological texts, half brackets, ⸤ and ⸥ or ⸢ and ⸣, enclose text which is lacking in the papyrus due to damage, but can be restored by virtue of another source, such as an ancient quotation of the text transmitted by the papyrus. For example, Callimachus Iambus 1.2 reads: ἐκ τῶν ὅκου βοῦν κολλύ⸤βου π⸥ιπρήσκουσιν. A hole in the papyrus has obliterated βου π, but these letters are supplied by an ancient commentary on the poem. Second intermittent sources can be between ⸢ and ⸣. Quine corners are sometimes used instead of half brackets.

Double brackets ⟦ ⟧
Double brackets (or white square brackets or Scott brackets), ⟦ ⟧, are used to indicate the semantic evaluation function in formal semantics for natural language and denotational semantics for programming languages. The brackets stand for a function that maps a linguistic expression to its "denotation" or semantic value. In mathematics, double brackets may also be used to denote intervals of integers or, less often, the floor function. In papyrology, following the Leiden Conventions, they are used to enclose text that has been deleted in antiquity.

Brackets with quills ⁅ ⁆

Unicode
Representations of various kinds of brackets in Unicode and HTML are given below.

The angle brackets or chevrons at U+27E8 and U+27E9 are for mathematical use and Western languages, whereas U+3008 and U+3009 are for East Asian languages. The chevrons at U+2329 and U+232A are deprecated in favour of the U+3008 and U+3009 East Asian angle brackets. Unicode discourages their use for mathematics and in Western texts, because they are canonically equivalent to the CJK code points U+300x and thus likely to render as double-width symbols. The less-than and greater-than symbols are often used as replacements for chevrons.

See also
 Bracket (mathematics)
 International variation in quotation marks
 Emoticon
 Japanese typographic symbols
 Order of operations
 Triple parentheses
 Arrowhead (combining and standalone characters similar to angle brackets or less-than and greater-than characters)

References

Bibliography
 
  States that what are depicted as brackets above are called braces and braces are called brackets. This was the terminology in US printing prior to computers.

External links
 
 

Punctuation
Mathematical notation